Alleyn is a surname (and occasionally a first name). Notable people with the surname include:

Charles Joseph Alleyn (1817–1890), Quebec lawyer and political figure
Edward Alleyn (1566–1626), English actor
James Alleyn (1683–1746), English educationalist
Sir John Alleyne, 1st Baronet (1724–1801), Speaker of the House of Assembly of Barbados
Sir John Alleyne, 3rd Baronet (1820–1912), British businessman and engineer
John Alleyn (surgeon) (died 1686), surgeon and fifth Master of the College of God's Gift in Dulwich
John Alleyn (MP) (1621–1663), British barrister and MP for Mitchell (Michael)
John Alleyn (mercer) (died 1544), Lord Mayor of London
Matthias Alleyn (died 1642), second Master of the College of God's Gift in Dulwich
Raph Alleyn (died c. 1677), fourth Master of the College of God's Gift in Dulwich
Roderick Alleyn, a fictional police detective
Thomas Alleyn (3rd Master of Dulwich College) (died c. 1668), third Master of the College of God's Gift in Dulwich
Thomas Alleyn (Barber-Surgeon) (died 1631), first Master of the College of God's Gift in Dulwich

See also
Allen
Alleyn's School